The former Kelso Stakes is a Grade II American Thoroughbred horse race for three-year-olds and older run over a distance of one mile (8 furlongs) on the dirt held annually in late October at Belmont Park in Elmont, New York. The event offers a purse of $300,000. In 2023 NYRA announced that the event would be renamed. The original Forbidden Apple Stakes held at Saratoga Race Course is to be renamed to the Kelso Stakes.

History

The event is named in honor of Kelso, Allaire du Pont's five-time winner of American Horse of the Year honors. Kelso won the Jockey Club Gold Cup at Belmont Park five times (1960–1964) consecutively at the then distance of 2 miles on the dirt. Fittingly NYRA scheduled the inaugural running of the Kelso Handicap over two miles at Aqueduct on 23 October 1980. At the time the event was the only $100,000 two mile event on the dirt in the US. The former claimer Peat Moss won the inaugural event as a 24-1 longshot in a time of 3:24. Peat Moss would repeat his winning ways the following year carrying a high-weight of 126 pounds.  The 1982 running would be the last time the event would be held at the marathon distance.  In 1983 the event was not held.

On 20 October 1984 the event was renewed as a  miles turf race on an all stakes card at Belmont Park which included the Jockey Club Gold Cup inheriting the classification status of Grade III from the Brighton Beach Handicap which became defunct with its last race on 24 August 1983.

In 1988 the event was shortened to one mile.

In 1997 the event was upgraded to Grade II.  In 2009, it had been originally being scheduled for turf before being moved to the main track due to extremely heavy rain the day before and consequently was down graded to Grade III. In 2010 the event was moved to the main dirt track.

Of the more notable winners of the event is Lure. Lure ran in the event three times winning in 1993 and finishing second twice in 1992 and 1994. In 1992 although finishing second as a three-year-old later that year he went on to win the Breeders' Cup Mile. In 1993 after winning this event he followed up in his next start winning the Breeders' Cup Mile at Santa Anita Park. In 1994 Lure just failed to win the event, beaten by a nose carrying 128 pounds and giving 14 pounds to the winner Nijinsky's Gold in a thrilling stretch battle.

The event in 2022 was moved to Aqueduct Racetrack due to infield tunnel and redevelopment work at Belmont Park. The event was moved to late October and the conditions of the changed from a handicap to a stakes allowance.

Records
Speed  record: 
1 mile (dirt) 1:32.90 – Anchor Down (2016)
1 mile (turf) 1:32.07 – Ashkal Way (2006)
 miles (turf) – 2:01.20 – Who's For Dinner (1984)
2 miles (dirt) – 3:20.80 Peat Moss (1981)

Margins:
5 lengths – Tizway (2010)

Most wins:
 2 – Peat Moss (1980, 1981) 
 2 – I'm a Banker (1985, 1986)
 2 – Forbidden Apple (2000, 2001)

Most wins by an owner:
 2 – Murray M. Garren (1980, 1981)
 2 – Godolphin Racing (1986, 1987)
 2 – Arthur I. Appleton (2000, 2001)
 2 – Klaravich Stables (2018, 2020)

Most wins by a jockey:
 4 – Javier Castellano (2007, 2008, 2012, 2016)

Most wins by a trainer:
 4 – Todd A. Pletcher (2011, 2013, 2016, 2021)

Winners

Legend:

See also
List of American and Canadian Graded races

References

Graded stakes races in the United States
Horse races in New York (state)
Open mile category horse races
Grade 2 stakes races in the United States
Recurring sporting events established in 1980
Belmont Park
1980 establishments in New York (state)